In My Own Time may refer to:

 In My Own Time (album), a 1971 album by Karen Dalton
 "In My Own Time" (Electric Light Orchestra song)
 "In My Own Time" (Family song)